The Jamshidi are a sub-tribe of the Chahar Aimaq ethnic group in Afghanistan, one of the four major Aimaq tribes, which also include the Firozkohi, Taymani, and Taimuri. The Jamshidi are a primarily sedentary people living in Herat and are believed to be of mixed Arab and Persian descent. Some Jamshidis have settled in Turkmenistan.

A 1926 publication notes that the Iranian city of Nishapur (in northeast Iran, near the Badghis Province of Afghanistan) has a population of "Jamshidis", originating from "north of Herat", who moved to the area following the 1856–1857 Anglo-Persian War. These Jamshidis self-described as Baluch, spoke Persian, and were Ismaili.

See also
Aimaq people

References

Aymaq
Ethnic groups in Herat Province
Modern nomads